Susan Sevillo (born May 24, 1962) known professionally as Susan Enriquez, is a Fiipino journalist, radio and TV news reporter and host for GMA Network, GMA News TV, GTV and DZBB-AM.

Background
Enriquez came from a poor family and as a child, she dreamed of becoming a factory worker. She earned a scholarship and extra income from helping in her mother's eatery for her studies towards a bachelor's degree in journalism at Lyceum of the Philippines University. She graduated in 1986. Her TV name "Enriquez" was her former husband's with whom she had a daughter in their marriage, which was annulled.

Radio
She started working at IBC Radio and a voice talent in 1981 at DZBB Newscoop. In 1989, she was hired as production assistant and writer in DZBB. She then hosted Kay Susan Na!, an infotainment radio program in DZBB that aired from 11:00 am until 12:00 noon.

Enriquez is a host in DZBB programs which were also aired on Dobol B sa News TV such as Easy Easy Lang and Kay Susan Tayo! sa Radyo.

TV career

GMA News
Enriquez became a TV news reporter for GMA News. In 1990, she was a reporter for GMA News Live, an hourly news update. Her first TV appearance was met with criticism from the audience for her lack of make-up, a practice she said that was not required during her radio stint. Her reports appeared in Saksi and 24 Oras.

Kay Susan Tayo!
Started in 2003, she hosted the TV show Kay Susan Tayo! on GMA Network. The program was described as a lifestyle show with "informative but also entertaining content." The program ran for six years. It won a Catholic Mass Media Awards' Best Informative Show award.

Unang Hirit
In 2010, she was one of the hosts in the morning TV show Unang Hirit. She returned to the program in 2013.

iJuander
In 2011, she co-hosted GMA News TV's iJuander with Cesar Apolinario. The show's format centered on Filipino identity, folklore, beliefs, and cuisine and earned the Anak TV Seal on the same year it began.

Other TV shows
On October 22, 2012, she was the host for GMA News TV's morning show Kape at Balita together with Joel Reyes Zobel, Mariz Umali, and Michael Fajatin. In addition, she was part of i-Witness creating documentaries and Emergency hosted by Arnold Clavio.

Aside from iJuander, Enriquez is currently serving as the host of Pera Paraan since it premiered on July 22, 2020, via GMA News TV. It was a part of the New Normal: The Survival Guide line-up by GMA Public Affairs. The show was carried over when GMA News TV was rebranded to GTV. It later moved to GMA on October 16, 2021.

Captivity
Enriquez was kidnapped by Abu Sayyaf while at work in Basilan on April 20, 2000, and was one of the journalists held in captivity. While other journalists were freed, she remained behind allegedly because one of the leaders was infatuated with her and planned to make her a spouse. Her release was made possible through the help of Noli de Castro.

Recognition
Ricky Lo of The Philippine Star wrote, "Since she is in our consciousness seemingly every hour on the hour from early morning to sometimes late at night when she pinch-hits for colleagues on leave, Susan Enriquez has become every household’s lovable companion who proves that big things indeed come in small packages." B. Allie Tah of Rappler also said, "Through the years, she has been consistent with her public persona as a warm and simple TV personality with a comprehensive, no-nonsense dedication in her trade of broadcast journalism." Isah V. Red wrote in Manila Standard, "Enriquez is known on TV as "Boses ng Masa." She is an accommodating news personality, especially among housewives who approach her for consumer problems, domestic concerns and barangay issues. They see her as their champion."

Awards

References

External links

1962 births
Living people
Filipino journalists
Lyceum of the Philippines University alumni
People from Legazpi, Albay
GMA Network personalities
GMA Integrated News and Public Affairs people
Kidnapped Filipino people